Kevin Deeromram (born 11 September 1997) is a professional footballer who plays as a left back for Thai League 1 club Port. born in Sweden, he represents the Thailand national football team.

International career
On 6 June 2017, Deeromram made the debut for Thailand in the friendly match against Uzbekistan.

Career statistics

International

Personal life
Deeromram was born in Stockholm to a Swedish father and a Thai mother from Buriram.

Honours
Port
 Thai FA Cup: 2019

Thailand U23
 Sea Games: 2017

References

External links
 

1997 births
Living people
Swedish people of Thai descent
Kevin Deeromram
Footballers from Stockholm
Swedish footballers
Kevin Deeromram
Association football fullbacks
Djurgårdens IF Fotboll players
SV Werder Bremen II players
Åtvidabergs FF players
Kevin Deeromram
Kevin Deeromram
Superettan players
Kevin Deeromram
Sweden youth international footballers
Kevin Deeromram
Kevin Deeromram
Kevin Deeromram
Southeast Asian Games medalists in football
Competitors at the 2017 Southeast Asian Games
Swedish expatriate footballers
Swedish expatriate sportspeople in Thailand
Thai expatriate footballers
Thai expatriate sportspeople in Germany
Expatriate footballers in Germany
Thai expatriate sportspeople in Sweden